Philip James Bartley (23 December 1914 – 1978) was an English professional footballer who played in the Football League for Mansfield Town and Rochdale.

References

1914 births
1978 deaths
English footballers
Association football forwards
English Football League players
Bentley Colliery F.C. players
Norwich City F.C. players
Rochdale A.F.C. players
Mansfield Town F.C. players
Scunthorpe United F.C. players
Ollerton Colliery F.C. players